Im Kyung-Hyun (born 6 October 1986) is a South Korea football forward is a South Korean footballer who plays for Bucheon FC in the K League Challenge.

References

1986 births
Living people
South Korean footballers
Busan IPark players
Suwon Samsung Bluewings players
Jeonnam Dragons players
Bucheon FC 1995 players
K League 1 players
K League 2 players
Association football midfielders